Harold Lindsay Vernon Day (12 August 1898, Darjeeling, Bengal, India - 15 June 1972, Hadley Wood, Hertfordshire, England) was an English rugby union footballer who played wing for Leicester Tigers and England.

Life
Harold Lindsay Vernon Day was born on 12 August 1898 at Darjeeling, Bengal, India.  He was educated at Bedford Modern School.

Day began his career with Leicester (1919–1929) during which time he scored a then-club record 1,151 points including 108 tries, 281 conversions, 81 penalty goals, 4 drop goals and 2 goals from a mark.  He gained four caps for England, versus Wales (1920, 1922), France (1922) and Scotland (1926).  He scored two tries, one in each of the Wales matches, and kicked one conversion against Wales in 1922 and a penalty and a conversion against France.

Day's England debut, against Wales in 1920, came in slightly unusual circumstances. W. M. Lowry was originally selected to play on the wing and was photographed with the team but was replaced by Day (then representing the Army) just before kick-off. The selectors felt that the conditions would suit Day better and he scored and converted England's only try of the game.

He also played 80 first-class cricket matches for Hampshire County Cricket Club, scoring 3,142 runs at an average of 25.33 which included four centuries and 18 half-centuries.

After retiring from sport, Day became Rugby Union correspondent and a Cricket reporter at the Daily Telegraph.  He died on 15 June 1972 at Hadley Wood, Hertfordshire, England.

References 

1898 births
1972 deaths
People educated at Bedford Modern School
People from Darjeeling
English rugby union players
England international rugby union players
Leicester Tigers players
English cricketers
Hampshire cricketers
Rugby union wings
Gentlemen cricketers
British Army cricketers
Bedfordshire cricketers
British people in colonial India